Stage Door is a 1937 RKO film directed by Gregory La Cava.

Stage Door may also refer to:
 Stage Door (play), a 1936 play and the basis of the film
 Stage Door (TV series), a Canadian music variety television series
 The Stage Door, an American drama series
 Stage Door Records, a UK record label

See also